Tyrone Edwards is a Canadian television broadcaster and entrepreneur, currently the cohost of CTV's entertainment magazine show eTalk.

He first became locally prominent in Toronto in the 2000s as a partner in 1LoveTO, a Toronto community and entertainment blog which expanded by 2011 into a clothing line. In 2011 he was hired by MuchMusic as the new host of RapCity, and served as an entertainment reporter and host for sister station E!. He joined eTalk as a reporter in 2018.

In June 2020 he was cohost with CTV's Anne-Marie Mediwake, Marci Ien and Elaine Lui of Change & Action: Racism in Canada, a public affairs special created by the network in response to the global anti-racism protests that followed the murder of George Floyd and the concurrent Canadian controversy around the death of Regis Korchinski-Paquet. He was announced as the new cohost of eTalk, replacing Ben Mulroney, on September 14; the following day, he was cohost with his eTalk colleague Chloe Wilde of the TIFF Tribute Awards telecast for the 2020 Toronto International Film Festival.

In addition to his television work, he is a partner in Miss Likklemore's, a Caribbean food restaurant on Queen Street West. During the COVID-19 pandemic in Canada, Edwards and his original 1LoveTO partners also launched See You Soon Toronto, a special clothing line whose profits were donated entirely to charities assisting workers impacted by the pandemic shutdowns.

References

Living people
Canadian television hosts
Canadian infotainers
Canadian restaurateurs
Canadian businesspeople in fashion
Much (TV channel) personalities
Black Canadian broadcasters
Black Canadian businesspeople
Canadian people of Jamaican descent
CTV Television Network people
Businesspeople from Toronto
Year of birth missing (living people)